NH7 may refer to:

 NH7 Weekender
 National Highway 7 (India)
 National Highway 44 (India), formerly known as National Highway 7 (until 2010)
 NH7 (webzine)

See also 

 List of highways numbered 7